Marcus Sixtensson (born July 4, 1977) is a Swedish bandy player who currently plays for Sandvikens AIK as a defender. He previously played for Villa Lidköping BK (1998-2000), BS Boltic/Göta (2000-2001) and Villa Lidköping BK (2001-2005).

External links
  Marcus Sixtensson at bandysidan
  Sandvikens AIK

Swedish bandy players
Living people
1977 births
Villa Lidköping BK players
IF Boltic players
Sandvikens AIK players
Gripen Trollhättan BK players
Vetlanda BK players